Scott Dierking (born May 24, 1955) is a former running back in the National Football League (NFL). He played for the New York Jets from 1977-1983 after being drafted in Round 4 of the 1977 NFL Draft.

College career
Before his NFL career, he played for Purdue University. In 1976, Dierking was named First-team All-Big Ten Conference.

Statistics
Source:

During his playing career, he was sometimes referred to as the human "coke machine" because of his build and toughness.

Personal life
His son, Dan Dierking, attended Wheaton Warrenville South High School in Wheaton, Illinois where he broke several of Harold "Red" Grange's records and carried his 2006 football team to a state championship; he subsequently won the 2006 Illinois Player of the Year Award. He attended Purdue University as a scholarship running back/full back. He was the team's starting FB for the 2009 season, was Purdue's finest cover man on special teams and was voted team captain for the 2010 season.

References

1955 births
Living people
People from Lake County, Illinois
American football running backs
Purdue Boilermakers football players
New York Jets players
Tampa Bay Buccaneers players
Sportspeople from Wheaton, Illinois
Players of American football from Illinois